The 1921 Kirkcaldy Burghs by-election was held on 4 March 1921.  The by-election was held due to the resignation of the incumbent Coalition Liberal MP, Henry Dalziel.  It was won by the Labour candidate Tom Kennedy.

References

Kirkcaldy Burghs by-election
Kirkcaldy Burghs by-election
1920s elections in Scotland
Kirkcaldy Burghs by-election
20th century in Fife
Politics of Fife
Kirkcaldy
By-elections to the Parliament of the United Kingdom in Scottish constituencies